Giorgio Ficara (born 20 June 1952 in Turin) is an Italian essayist and literary critic. He is Full Professor of Italian Literature at the University of Turin.

Biography 
Born in Turin in 1952, Ficara attended the city’s Jesuit classical high school. A student of Giovanni Getto, he received his baccalaureate from the University of Turin in 1974 with an undergraduate thesis on Gabriele D'Annunzio. From 1975 to 1981 he was Assistant to the Chair of Italian Literature, a post held by Getto. From 1982 to 1999 he was a research fellow and lecturer; from 1999 to the present he has held the position of Full Professor and Chair of Italian Literature at the University of Turin’s Atheneum.

Ficara was co-director of Nuovi Argomenti (1989-1999) and literary critic for Panorama (1988 – 1997) and La Stampa (1978 - 2012). He currently collaborates with the Sunday edition of Il Sole 24 Ore and is co-director of Lettere italiane, a journal founded by Vittore Branca and Giovanni Getto. He is a corresponding member of the Lorenzo Valla Foundation and the Bembo Foundation. He is director of the De Sanctis Foundation of Rome and president of the De Sanctis Prize for Essay Writing.

Ficara has been a visiting professor in the United States at UCLA, Stanford University, the University of Chicago and at Columbia University. He has also taught in Paris at the Sorbonne and at the Collège de France, as well as in various European universities.
Literary critic, historian of literature and of literary-philosophical systems, and comparatist, his areas of study are Francesco Petrarca, Giacomo Leopardi, Giacomo Casanova and eighteenth-century European literature, Alessandro Manzoni, and twentieth-century Italian literature, with a particular interest in Montale and the question of the novel’s origins.

His literary criticism merges non-fiction and textual criticism in order to elucidate the hermeneutics of the literary work: “Why is criticism always less an explanation of and commentary on the text and more an alternative to a text that does not exist? Or rather: why is criticism itself no longer necessary for a work that explains everything on its own? [...] Contingent upon the writer’s ‘original' prose, the critic’s applied prose exists, in effect, because the other text exists even more.”

"Ficara is one of those scholars who believes that (and attempts to put into practice) the writer’s contribution should not be viewed as secondary with respect to the professional contribution of the critic. Writing is a different means of speaking about literature, a more free, or more vertiginous or concise means to say the same things as the critic. [...] Ficara, who has set out on this particular path, is quite adept at concocting these mixtures of narration and interpretation, these moments and flashes in which we don’t know whether the narrator or the critic will prevail" (Gian Luigi Beccaria, Stile Novecento: il romanzo delle idee, "Tuttolibri-La Stampa", 16 June 2007, p. 5).

"For Ficara what matters is the struggle, leading to an exchange of position, between narrative play and the awakening of the conscience: 'pure play in Laurence Sterne', 'play that yields to awareness in Alessandro Manzoni', 'dream-play of the conscience in Italo Calvino'. Fiction exists in the service of truth and truth does not exist without storytelling and without a 'crossroads of perspectives.’" (Alfonso Berardinelli, Il Novecento davanti a noi, Il Sole 24 Ore, 13 January 2008, p. 37).

Prizes 
 1984 Borgia Prize for Essay Writing from the Accademia Nazionale dei Lincei
 1993 Lerici Prize (for Solitudini)
 1999 Ischia Prize (for Casanova e la malinconia)
 2010 Casinò di San Remo Libro del Mare Prize (for Riviera)
 2010 Tarquinia-Cardarelli Prize for Literary Criticism 
 2011 Prize for Essay Writing from the Accademia Nazionale dei Lincei

Works

Monographs 
 Solitudini. Studi sulla letteratura italiana dal Duecento al Novecento, Milan, Garzanti Editore, 1993
 Il punto di vista della natura. Saggio su Leopardi, Genoa, Il melangolo, 1996, 
 Casanova e la malinconia, Turin, Einaudi, 1999 , 
 Stile Novecento, Venice, Marsilio Editori, 2007, 
 Riviera. La via lungo l'acqua, Turin, Einaudi, 2010, 
 Montale sentimentale, Venice, Marsilio, 2012,  
 Lettere non italiane, Milan, Bompiani, 2016, 
 Lettura del "Canto notturno", Turin, Einaudi ebook, i.c.s.
 Vite libertine. Le mille e una notte della ragione, Turin, Einaudi, i.c.s.

Editions e commentaries 
 Giuseppe Parini, Il Giorno, Milan, Mondadori, 1984, 
 Alessandro Manzoni, I promessi sposi, Turin, Petrini Editore, 1986
 Giacomo Leopardi, Canti, Milan, Mondadori, 1987, 
 Giacomo Leopardi, Operette Morali, Milan, Mondadori, 1988, 
 Giacomo Leopardi, Lettere, Milan, Mondadori, 1991
 Francesco Petrarca, De vita solitaria, Milan, Mondadori, 1992
 Giacomo Leopardi, Memorie e pensieri d'amore, Turin, Einaudi, 1993, 
 Francesco De Sanctis, Storia della Letteratura Italiana, Turin, Einaudi-Gallimard, 1996, 
 Mario Praz, Bellezza e bizzarria. Saggi critici, Milan, Mondadori, 2002, 
 Con L. Marcozzi, Viaggio tra i capolavori della letteratura italiana, Milan, Skira, 2011,

Selected articles 
 Prefazione a Francesco Biamonti, Le parole e la notte, Turin, Einaudi, 2014, pp. i-xiv, 
 Prefazione a Mario Novaro, Murmuri ed Echi, critical edition by V. Pesce, Genoa, San Marco Giustiniani, 2011 
 Lo spirito del luogo del Gattopardo, in Il Gattopardo at Fifty, ed. by D. Messina, Ravenna, Longo, 2010, pp. 69–72, 
 Petites maisons, in "Levia gravia", 12, 2010, pp. 211–215
 La filosofia della vita di Marziano Guglielminetti, in Atti del Convegno Marziano Guglielminetti. Un viaggio nella letteratura, ed. by C. Allasia and L. Nay, Turin, Edizioni dell'Orso, 2009, pp. 93–97
 Amici per l'eternità. Preface to Giorgio Caproni- Carlo Betocchi, Una poesia indimenticabile: lettere, 1936-1986, ed. by D. Santero, Lucca, Pacini Fazzi, 2007, pp. 5–8
 Cercatore d'infinito. Saggio su Luzi., in "Studi italiani", 16-17, 2005, pp. 9–14
 Francesco e la via difficile., in Francesco Biamonti: le parole, il silenzio. Atti del Convegno di Studi Francesco Biamonti: le parole, il silenzio, San Biagio della Cima, Centro culturale Le Rose; Bordighera, Chiesa anglicana, 16-18 ottobre 2003, ed. by A. Aveto and F. Merlani, Genoa, Il melangolo, 2005, pp. 17 sgg.
 Homo fictus, in Franco Moretti (ed.), Il romanzo, vol. IV: Temi, luoghi, eroi, Turin, Einaudi, 2003, pp. 641–658
 Getto, Manzoni e l'aria di casa, in "Lettere italiane",  3, 2003, pp. 392–398
 Introduction to Mario Praz, Bellezza e bizzarria. Saggi scelti, Milan, Mondadori, 2002, pp. i-lxxvi
 L'eternità infranta: illusionismi dannunziani., in "Lettere italiane", 3, 2002, pp. 149–170
 Introduction to Francesco De Sanctis, Storia della letteratura italiana, ed. by G. Ficara, Turin, Einaudi-Gallimard, 1996, pp. ix-xxxii 
 Introduction to Giacomo Leopardi, Memorie e pensieri d'amore, Turin, Einaudi, 1993, pp. i-xlii
 Introduction to Francesco Petrarca, De vita solitaria, ed. by G. Ficara, Milan, Mondadori, 1992, pp. v-xxxiv
 Su mari analoghi. Introduction to Giacomo Leopardi, Operette morali, ed. by G. Ficara, Milan, Mondadori, 1988, pp. 5–27
 Il punto di vista della natura. Introduction to Giacomo Leopardi, Canti, ed. by G. Ficara, Milan, Mondadori, 1987, pp. 7–33
 Le parole e la peste in Manzoni, in "Lettere italiane", 31, 1, 1981, pp. 3–37
 Renzo, l'allievo delle Muse, in "Lettere italiane", 19, 1, 1977, pp. 34–58

Notes

Bibliography 
 Enzo Siciliano, Quanta solitudine nel Giovin Signore, "Corriere della Sera", 18 July 1993, p. 20
 Michel David, Malinconico Casanova, "Modern Language Review", 96, 2001, pp. 535–537 (Italian version)
 Gian Luigi Beccaria, Stile Novecento: il Romanzo delle idee, "Tuttolibri - La Stampa", 16 June 2007, p. 5
 Giorgio Ficara, in Dizionario della critica militante. Letteratura e mondo contemporaneo, a c. di Giuseppe Leonelli e Filippo La Porta, Milan, Bompiani, 2007
 Alfonso Berardinelli, Il Novecento davanti a noi, "Il Sole 24 Ore", 13 January 2008, p. 37
 Raffaele La Capria, La Liguria insegue l'orizzonte (non come la mia Napoli), "Corriere della Sera", 11 June 2010, p. 48
 Paolo Mauri, Ricordi e poesia della Riviera, "Repubblica", 11 June 2010
 Massimo Onofri, Il sentimento di Clizia, "Il Sole 24 ore", 22 April 2012, p. 25
 Raffaele Manica, Montale. Spirito e lettera sul ring dei "Mottetti", "Alias-Il manifesto", 10 June 2012, p. 5

External links 
 
 
 
 
 
 
 
 
 
 
 
 
 
 
 
 

1952 births
Living people
Italian essayists
Male essayists
Italian literary critics
University of Turin alumni
Academic staff of the University of Turin
Italian male non-fiction writers